Bristol Channel was a cable television broadcaster that operated in the Bristol area of England during a period of experimental licensing of cable community television in the 1970s. It was run by Rediffusion and existed from 17 May 1973 to March 1975.

See also 
 List of former TV channels in the United Kingdom
 Television in the United Kingdom

References

Further reading 
  
 

Community television channels in the United Kingdom
Mass media in Bristol
Television channels and stations established in 1973
1973 establishments in England
Defunct television channels in the United Kingdom
Television channels and stations disestablished in 1975
1975 disestablishments in England